Unka may refer to:

 Unka, Brod, a village in Bosnia and Herzegovina
 Vasanti Unka, writer and illustrator
 Unka (cricket), a genus of insect in subfamily Podoscirtinae

See also 
 Yunka (disambiguation)
 UNCA (disambiguation)
 Uncas (disambiguation)